Kajra Re is a song composed by Shankar–Ehsaan–Loy, written by Gulzar and sung by the playback singers Alisha Chinoy, Shankar Mahadevan and Javed Ali. It is from the 2005 film Bunty Aur Babli, starring Abhishek Bachchan, Rani Mukerji and Amitabh Bachchan. Aishwarya Rai plays a courtesan trying to express her desires to attract the male, or her client. It features Amitabh and Abhishek at a nightclub and Aishwarya Rai, making a special appearance in the film, sings for Amitabh, who joins her with Abhishek in the singing and dancing. Aishwarya went on to marry Abhishek Bachhan and thus became the daughter-in-law of Amitabh, who she is trying to seduce in the song

Production and development
Kajra Re is inspired from a folk song from the Braj region, in which the celebrated dark eyes are Lord Krishna's. The words "Tujhse milna purani dilli mein" have been rendered by Amitabh Bachchan. It was a very famous "item number" from the movie Bunty Aur Babli. Uncommon to other "item songs" the music was influenced by the genre of kajari.
The trio have used sitar to make it sound more Indian. Amitabh Bachchan, after initially hearing the song, demanded a few changes, but the director, Shaad Ali, and producer, Aditya Chopra, convinced him against them. The song was composed in half a day. Alisha was chosen for the female vocals since her anglicized accent was meant to provide an essentially different intonation.

Reception and impact
The melody of this song was used as the main method to promote the film and the soundtrack.
The song became extremely popular among the masses and was hugely successful on Indian music charts. The Hindustan Times described it as "the reinvention of the qawwali by Shankar-Ehsaan-Roy and Gulzar" and called it "the item number of the decade." Kajra Re featured on top in Rediffs 2005's list of top 5 songs. It also won the poll conducted by Planet Bollywood as the song of the year with a whopping 44%.

It was voted as the song of the year by three radio stations, including Lotus FM, a station popular among the Indian diaspora in South Africa. The song was also featured in Caminho das Indias, a marathon telenovela that ran on Brazil's popular Rede Globo. The track was featured in Hindustan Times' Songs of the Century, which deemed it to be the "undisputed item song of the decade."

Music video
Before the song sequence, Amitabh, who plays a police inspector in the movie, relates his story of unrequited love in the city of Delhi to Abhishek, which is later alluded to in the song. Aishwarya's character, a bar girl, sympathizes with Amitabh's character and plays courtesan. The dance, choreographed by Vaibhavi Merchant, features Aishwarya in a brocade choli and dipped ghagra, kohl, and some lip gloss.

Awards
Alisha Chinai won the 2005 Filmfare Best Female Playback Award and the 2005 Bollywood Movie Award - Best Playback Singer Female for the song, while Gulzar collected the best lyricist award in almost all major award functions including the IIFA and Filmfare Awards, for the song.

Vaibhavi Merchant won the following awards:
IIFA Best Choreography Award
Zee Best Choreography Award
Star Screen Awards - Best Choreography
Apsara Best Choreography Award

Trivia
The music video is 7:50 seconds long; the album version, available on the movie soundtrack, lasts 8 minutes 4 seconds. There are two official remixes to this song: "Special Movie Remix" which is 5 minutes and 33 seconds and "Aqeel Tribal Mix" which is 5 minutes 49 seconds. The remixes sound very similar.
A portion of "Kajrare" is featured in Dor with Gul Panag, Ayesha Takia, and Shreyas Talpade dancing along in the desert.
A parody of this song is featured in the movie Chennai Express.

References

Indian songs
Hindi film songs
Songs with music by Shankar–Ehsaan–Loy
2005 songs
Songs with lyrics by Gulzar
Shankar Mahadevan songs
Alisha Chinai songs
Qawwali songs